Red Bull BC One is an annual international B-Boy competition organized by the beverage company Red Bull. It is an individual B-Boy competition, notable for being the only one of the major international breaking championships to not include a crew event. The main event is a knockout tournament featuring sixteen B-Boys and B-Girls, chosen for exceptional skills in the dance and good character, competing in one-on-one battles decided by a panel of five judges. Regional finals are held for North America, Eastern Europe, Western Europe, Latin America, Asia Pacific, and Middle East and Africa. The winners of each region go on and participate in the World Finals. The inaugural BC One was held in Biel, Switzerland in 2004.

An official Red Bull BC One DVD was released for the 2004 and 2005 events. The production of the DVDs has been criticized due to restrictive music playing rights, as the live music played during the competition had to be dubbed over. From 2006 onwards, Red Bull stopped releasing DVDs and made the videos available online for free.

In 2007, Alastair Siddon directed a film about the Red Bull BC One 2007 competition. The film was released in March 2010 under the title, Turn it Loose.

Since 2014, Red Bull BC One partnered up with the World BBoy Series and helped create Undisputed, an event to crown the solo world b-boy champion.

Winners

2022 

For its 19th edition, the Red Bull BC One World Final returns to New York City, the birthplace of hip-hop, to celebrate breaking heritage and crown this year's world champions. On Saturday, November 12, 2022, breakers from across the world will reunite for this important moment in the art form's trajectory to battle it out at the world's most highly anticipated one-on-one breaking competition.

Judges:

  Sick (Gamblerz)
  Ayumi (Body Carnival)
  Jey (Legiteam Obstruxion)
  Fabgirl (BSB Girls)
  Kid Glyde (Dynamic Rockers)

MC:

  Wicket (Renegade Rockers)
  MyVerse

DJ:

  DJ Skeme Richards (Rock Steady Crew)

Competitors

Results 

Location: New York, United States

B-Girl World Final

Results 

Location: New York, United States

2021 

The best breakers from around the world will come together to represent their country and battle it out in a solo B-Boy and B-Girl competition, with the winners being crowned the 2021 Red Bull BC One world champions and taking home the highly sought after championship belts, the 18th edition of the prestigious breaking competition will take place for the first time in Gdańsk, Poland, on November 5 and 6.

Judges:

  Menno (Hustle Kidz / Deaf Dogs)
  Sarah Bee (Zamounda)
  Kleju (Polskee Flavour / Funky Masons)
  Beta (Ground Zero Crew / Heartbreakerz / MF Kidz)
  El Niño (Floorlords / Flava Squad / Squadron / Boogie Brats)

MC:

  Amjad ($7 Crew)

DJ:

  DJ Plash One (Dons Crew)

Competitors

Results 

Location: Gdańsk, Poland

B-Girl World Final

Results 

Location: Gdańsk, Poland

2020 

This year in its 17th edition, 8 of the best B-Boys and B-Girls jetting off to Salzburg, Austria, to compete in the biggest Breaking 1 vs 1 competition in the World, to become the World champions, Their destination is the Red Bull BC One World Final 2020 on November 28. Here's how to get the perfect view for every battle.

Judges:

  Omar (Mighty Zulu Kingz)
  Movie One (Natural Moves)
  AT (Flow Mo)
  Lilou (Pockemon Crew)
  Ayumi (Body Carnival)

MC:

  Redchild

DJ:

  Just a Kid

Competitors

Results 

Location: Salzburg, Austria

B-Girl World Final

Results 

Location: Salzburg, Austria

2019 

In its 16th edition, the world's biggest breakdance competition will travel the world again for the best B-Boys and B-Girls in the world. Each year, thousands of dancers compete in the national finals and the winners go to the Red Bull BC One World Final, in which 16 participate, but only one is crowned champion. This year the world final already has date and place to happen: November 9, in Mumbai, India.

Judges:

  Lil G (Speedy Angels / Team Vinotinto)
  Poe One (Style Elements / Mighty Zulu Kingz)
  Narumi (Body Carnival)
  Intact (Ruffneck Attack)
  Physicx (Rivers Crew)

MC:

  Amjad ($7 Crew)

DJ:

  DJ Smirnoff

Competitors

Results 

Location: Mumbai, India

B-Girl World Final

Results 

Location: Mumbai, India

2018 
In 2004, the first Red Bull BC One Cypher went down at the cultural centre La Coupole in Biel. Fourteen years later, the world's most prestigious breaking battle goes back to Switzerland. This time, the Hallenstadion in northern Zurich will host the clash of the world's best breakers, on September 29, 2018.

Judges:

  Tuff Kid (Basel City Attack)
  Benny (Flying Steps)
  Wicket (Renegade Rockers)
  Junior (Wanted Posse)
  Taisuke (Flooriorz / Super Cr3w)

MC:

  Amjad ($7 Crew)

DJ:

  DJ Fleg (Lionz of Zion)

Competitors

Results 

Location: Zurich, Switzerland

B-Girl World Final

Results 

Location: Zurich, Switzerland

2017 
2017 Red Bull BC One was held in Amsterdam, Netherlands on November 4, 2017. This time around, BC One hopefuls go head-to-head in over 35 qualifying cyphers and six camps to determine who makes the Amsterdam cut. The three-day camps will be held in Spain, Russia, France, Turkey, Japan, and Netherlands, reflecting the local creative landscape with lectures, workshops, art exhibitions, club nights and battles. All the winners will earn the chance to compete for the last open spot, just days before the hugely anticipated World Final gets broadcast to the world. Ayumi made history as the first B-girl in history to compete in Red Bull BC One.

Judges:

  Crazy Legs (Rock Steady Crew)
  Hong 10 (Drifterz / 7 Commandoz)
  Niek (The Ruggeds)
  Intact (Ruffneck Attack)
  AT (Flow Mo)

MC:

  Rakaa (Dilated Peoples / Rock Steady Crew / Universal Zulu Nation)

DJ:

  DJ Nobunaga (Extraordinary Gentlemen)

Competitors

Results 

Location: Amsterdam, Netherlands

2016 
In 2016, Red Bull BC One will hold camps around the world that will feature traditional cyphers. It will no longer hold the six regional finals from previous years. Camps will be held in Austria, France, South Africa, Italy, Japan, and Ukraine. The winners of each cypher will compete in a Last Chance Cypher to qualify to the World Finals. The winners of Last Chance Cypher will battle in Nagoya alongside fifteen Wild Card entries, chosen by an international team of B-Boy experts. Red Bull BC One World Finals 2016 will take place in Aichi Prefectural Gymnasium, Nagoya, Japan on December 3. This also happened to be the final BC One that would feature Taisuke, as he announced his retirement from this competition. Meanwhile, Issei's victory meant that he would be the first Japanese champion of Red Bull BC One.

Judges:

  Storm (Battle Squad)
  Freeze (Ghost Crew)
  Wicket (Renegade Rockers)
  Kosuke (Waseda Breakers)
  Mounir (Vagabonds)

MC:

  Rakaa (Dilated Peoples / Rock Steady Crew / Universal Zulu Nation)

DJ:

  DJ Mar Ski (Universal Zulu Nation Japan)

Competitors

Results 

Location: Nagoya, Japan

2015 

On November 14, Red Bull BC One World Finals, the most iconic global B-Boy competition, will take place in the Eternal City, in Rome's Palazzo dei Congressi. Throughout the year, over 70 cyphers took place around the globe. Sixteen of each country's best B-Boys went head-to-head for the chance to represent at six regional Finals in Georgia, the United States, Peru, South Korea, Spain and Egypt. The winners of these finals will battle in Rome alongside ten Wild Card entries, chosen by an international team of B-Boy experts.

Judges:

  Cico (Spinkingz)
  Focus (Flow Mo)
  Wing (Jinjo Crew / 7 Commandoz)
  Lamine (Vagabonds)
  Poe One (Style Elements / Mighty Zulu Kingz)

MC:

  MC Supernatural

DJ:

  DJ Marrrtin (Funky Bijou)

Competitors

Results 

Location: Rome, Italy

2014 

Red Bull BC One took place in Paris, France. In 2014, Red Bull BC One utilized a round-by-round judging system used by Undisputed. The round-by-round judging format allows boys to see the judges decision after every round. The battle is set for 3 rounds (Finals is 5) but can end if a boy beats his opponent in 2. However, this judging system received a lot of criticism from Red Bull BC One fans throughout social media following the event. Bboys and fans alike, both disagreed heavily with the judges's decisions after many individual battles. Many argued that it was the worst Red Bull BC one competition since its initiation. Due to Menno winning Red Bull BC One and Chelles Battle Pro, Gravity was awarded the final spot at Undisputed at the end of the year following Red Bull BC One.

Judges:

  The End (Gamblerz / C.A.Y. Crew)
  Yan the Shrimp (Allthemost Crew)
  Ken Swift (Rock Steady Crew)
  Yaman (Wanted Posse)
  Luigi (Skill Methodz / Skill Brat Renegades)

MC:

  Joey Starr

DJ

  DJ Lean Rock (Squadron)

Competitors

Results 

Location: Paris, France

2013 

Red Bull BC One took place in Seoul, South Korea, on November 30, 2013.

Judges:

  Poe One (Style Elements / Mighty Zulu Kingz)
  El Niño (Floor Lords / Flava Squad / Squadron / Boogie Brats)
  Ducky (Drifterz / Floor Gangz)
  Storm (Battle Squad)
  Lamine (Vagabonds)

MC:

  Jay Park

DJ:

  DJ Lean Rock (Squadron)

Competitors

Results 

Location: Seoul, Korea

2012 

Red Bull BC One took place in Rio de Janeiro, Brazil on December 8, 2012.

Judges:

  Neguin (Tsunami All-Stars)
  Taisuke (All Area Crew / Flooriorz / Mighty Zulu Kingz)
  Moy (Havikoro)
  Niek (The Ruggeds)
  Storm (Battle Squad)

MC:

  Dughettu

DJ:

  DJ Skeme Richards (Rock Steady Crew)

Competitors

Results 

Location: Rio de Janeiro, Brazil

2011 

Red Bull BC One took place in Moscow, Russia on November 26, 2011.

Judges:

  Bootuz (Predatorz)
 Lamine (Vagabonds)
  Machine (Killafornia / Mighty Zulu Kingz)
  Pelezinho (Tsunami All-Stars)
  Wing (Jinjo Crew / 7 Commandoz)

MC:

  Rakaa Iriscience (Dilated Peoples / Rock Steady Crew / Universal Zulu Nation)

DJ:

  DJ Renegade (Soul Mavericks)

Competitors

Results 

Location: Moscow, Russia

2010 

Red Bull BC One 2010 took place in Tokyo, Japan on November 27, 2010. This marks the first time the competition was held in Asia.

Judges:

  Ken Swift (Rock Steady Crew)
  Born (Rivers Crew / Floor Gangz / Mighty Zulu Kingz / Flava Squad)
  Storm (Battle Squad)
  Roxrite (Break Disciples / Renegades / Squadron)
  Lilou (Pockemon Crew)

MC:

  Rahzel (former member of The Roots)

DJ:

  DJ Mar Ski (Universal Zulu Nation Japan)

Competitors

Results 

Location: Tokyo, Japan

2009 

Red Bull BC One was held on November 18, 2009, at the Hammerstein Ballroom in New York City.  Tickets went on sale at midnight, October 9, 2009, and were sold out within 30 minutes.

Judges:

  Katsu (All Area Crew / Mighty Zulu Kingz)
  Salah (Vagabonds / Massive Monkees)
  Ronnie (Full Force / Super Cr3w / 7 Commandoz)
  Cico (Spinkingz)
  Float (Incredible Breakers)

MC:

  KRS-One

DJ:

  DJ DP One (Turntable Anihilists / Supreme Beings)

Competitors

Results 

Location: New York City, United States

2008 

For 2008, Red Bull BC One was held in Paris on November 5 at the new 104 Cent Quatre avenue.

Judges:

  Ivan (Style Elements)
  Extremo (Addictos)
  Hong 10 (Drifterz)
  Lilou (Pockemon Crew)
  Storm (Battle Squad)

MC:

  Rakaa Iriscience (Dilated Peoples / Rock Steady Crew / Universal Zulu Nation)

DJ:

  DJ Tee

Competitors

Results 

Location: Paris, France

2007 

For 2007, qualifiers were held in May and June in 10 countries: Algeria, France, Japan, Germany, Brazil, South Africa, United States, Sweden, Taiwan, and Russia. The winner from each of these nine events, along with four wild card entries and the top 3 finishers from last year's 2006 main event, are the final 16 for the 2007 main event. However, two of the breakdancers – Baek, a wild card selection, and Niek, who won the Germany qualifier – had to withdraw from the competition due to injury. They were replaced by B-boys Cico and Jed.

Judges:

  Speedy (Battle Squad)
  Emile (Black Noise)
  Kazuhiro (King Ark)
  Kujo (Soul Control / Ill Abilities)
  Salah (Vagabonds / Massive Monkees)

MC:

  Rakaa Iriscience (Dilated Peoples / Rock Steady Crew / Universal Zulu Nation)

DJ:

  DJ Renegade (Soul Mavericks)

Competitors

Results 

Location: Johannesburg, South Africa

2006 

Judges:

  Storm (Battle Squad)
  Rokafella (Full Circle Soul / Collective 7)
  Andrezinho (Discipulos do Ritmo)
  Sonic (Natural Effects)
  Junior (Wanted Posse)

MC:

DJ:

Competitors

Results 

Location : São Paulo, Brazil

2005 

Judges:

  Asia One (Rock Steady Crew)
  Ducky (Drifterz / Project Seoul)
  David Colas (Compagnie Phorm)
  Poe One (Rock So Fresh/Style Elements / Mighty Zulu Kingz)
  Storm (Battle Squad)

MC:

  Rahzel (former member of The Roots)

DJ:

 DJ Ace and DJ Billy Brown

Competitors

Results 

Location : Berlin, Germany

2004 

Judges:

  Benny (Flying Steps)
  Lamine (Vagabonds)
  George (Wickid Force)
  Asia One (Rock Steady Crew)
  Tuff Kid (Basel City Attack)

MC:

  Rahzel (former member of The Roots)

DJ:

  DJ Supreme

Competitors

Results 

Location : Biel, Switzerland

Red Bull BC One All Stars 

Red Bull BC One All Stars is a crew of thirteen internationally renowned dancers, representing the best of the best in the scene. Together, they showcase the art of B-Boying in all of its many forms. Each of the 14 B-Boys has competed in the Red Bull BC One, the world's most important one-on-one B-Boy battle.

They serve as ambassadors of Hip Hop culture, with their main goal of giving back to the community and sharing their wealth of experience and skills with the younger generation of dancers. They travel the world to teach workshops, judge competitions and, of course, battle, continually challenging and pushing the limits of B-Boying.

Each crewmember is an outstanding individual in his community, bringing a certain style, skillset and original movement to the group, from hardcore power moves to intricate footwork. New members are chosen by the existing crewmembers, and one new member is added every year.

Red Bull BC One All Stars is not a just collected crew, but still as a real crew that battling worldwide. Some notable achievements are as follows:

 Winner of 2v2 Battle at Outbreak Europe 2015 (Roxrite & Menno)
 Winner of 3v3 Battle at Renegade Rockers 32nd Anniversary 2015 (Roxrite, Neguin, Menno)
 Winner of Crew Battle at UK B-Boy Championships 2016
 Winner of 3v3 Need For Dance 2017 (Lil G, Hong 10, Menno)
 Winner of 2v2 Battle De Vaulx 2017 (Menno & Wing)
 Winner of 3v3 Battle at Floorlords 36th Anniversary 2017 (Roxrite, Victor, Menno)
 Winner of Seven All Star 2 Smoke at The Notorious IBE 2017
 Winner of 2v2 LCB "Choose Your Destiny" 2017 (Taisuke & Issei)
 Winner of 3v3 Undisputed 2018 (Roxrite, Neguin, Victor)
 Winner of Crew vs Crew Circle Industry 2018 (Roxrite, Taisuke, Victor, Menno, Junior)
 Winner of 3v3 HIP OPsession 2018 (Hong 10, Wing, Ronnie)
 Winner of Crew Battle Legits Blast Winter 2018
 Winner of 4v4 SCAPE Radikal Forze Jam 2018 (Victor, Wing, Menno)
 Winner of 2v2 Battle De Vaulx 2018 (Victor & Roxrite)
 Winner of 2v2 Freestyle Session 2018 (Hong 10 & Wing)
 Winner of 3v3 United Styles 2019 (Hong 10, Menno, Neguin)
 Winner of 5v5 Checkmate - Circle Industry (Ronnie, Neguin, Menno, Lil Zoo, Ami)
 Winner of 4v4 Bucheon Bboy International Festival (Hong 10, Taisuke, Lil Zoo, Sunni)
 Winner of 3v3 Freestyle Session 2019 (Menno, Victor, Lil G)

Bboy in Bold denotes former Red Bull BC One champion.

Statistics

Most individual battle wins

Bgirls

Participants by region 

Bboy in Bold denotes former Red Bull BC One champion.

 Middle East Africa

  Lil Zoo (2012-2013, 2015, 2017–2020, 2022)
  Cri6 (2018)
  The Wolfer (2018)
  Ben-J (2007)
  Benny (2005, 2007–2008, 2014)
  Jed (2006–2007)

 Eastern Europe

  Wild Jerry (2021)
  Slav (2012)
  Killa Kolya (2015, 2019–2020)
  Amir (2021-2022)
  Kleju (2010, 2016)
  Thomaz (2015, 2021)
  Wigor (2022)
  Jora (2005)
  Bootuz (2006–2007)
  Flying Buddha (2009, 2011)
  Yan (2011)
  Alkolil / ExacT (2012, 2014–2015, 2017, 2020)
  Cheerito (2014, 2016)
  Bumblebee (2019)
  Beetle (2019)
  Gun (2021)
  Kolobok (2008–2009)
  Pluto (2010)
  Robin (2013, 2019)
  Kuzya (2016)
  Lussy Sky (2017)
  Uzee Rock (2018)

 Western Europe

  Sonic (2004–2005)
  Zoopreme (2021)
  Extremo (2004)
  Chey (2018)
  Xak (2021)
  Johnny Fox (2021)
  Focus (2016)
  By (2004)
  Junior (2004-2005, 2012)
  Brahim (2005)
  Lilou (2005-2007, 2009, 2013–2014)
  Crazy Monkey (2006)
  Sébastien (2007)
  Lil Kev (2008, 2018)
  Mounir (2008, 2012–2014)
  Punisher (2009)
  Keyz (2010)
  Marcio (2010)
  SoSo (2011, 2016)
  Tonio (2014)
  Nasso (2015)
  Willy (2017)
  Danny Dann (2017)
  Khalil (2019)
  Pac Pac (2020)
  Marlone (2022)
  KC (2004)
  Leo (2004)
  Rubber Legz (2005)
  Lil Ceng (2006, 2008–2009)
  Airdit (2010)
  Onel (2019)
  Mighty Jim (2022)
  Cico (2005, 2007–2008)
  Froz (2013)
  Menno (2008-2009,2013-2015, 2017, 2019)
  Niek / Just Do It (2008, 2010–2011)
  Kid Colombia (2016, 2018)
  Shane (2017)
  Tawfiq (2021)
  Lee (2021,2022)
  Lorenzo (2022)
  Dark Marc (2007)
  Lagaet (2009, 2011, 2021)
  Bruce Almighty (2015-2016)
  Nuno (2004)
  Lil' Tim (2004)
  Mouse (2006)
  Sunni (2012, 2015–2016, 2018, 2021)
  Kid Karam (2020)

 Asia Pacific

  Wongo (2004)
  Nasa (2008)
  Blond (2014)
  Drunk (2007)
  Flying Machine (2019)
  Kouske (2004)
  Kaku (2006, 2009)
  Taisuke (2007-2008, 2010–2011, 2013–2014, 2016)
  Toshiki (2010)
  Issei (2012, 2016–2018)
  Nori (2013, 2016, 2018–2019, 2021)
  Kazuki Rock (2015, 2019)
  Shigekix (2017, 2020, 2021)
  Ayumi (2017)
  Yu-Ki (2022)
  Issin (2022)
  Eagle (2004)
  Wake Up (2004)
  Born (2005)
  Physicx (2005)
  Hong 10 (2005-2007, 2011, 2013–2014, 2016)
  The End (2006)
  Baek (2008)
  Wing (2008-2009, 2013–2014, 2017)
  Differ (2009, 2012)
  Beast (2010)
  Kill (2010, 2017)
  Vero (2011, 2018, 2020)
  Shorty Force (2012)
  Leon (2015)
  Pocket (2015)
  Heady (2019)
  Monkey King (2019)
  Quake (2022)
  3T (2011)

 North America

  Phil Wizard (2019, 2021–2022)
  Illz (2022)
  Hill (2012, 2018)
  Omar (2004-2005, 2013)
  Ronnie (2004-2008, 2013)
  Bebe (2004)
  Iron Monkey (2004)
  Machine (2005)
  Moy (2005, 2017)
  Do Knock (2006)
  Roxrite (2006-2007, 2011–2013)
  Twixx (2007)
  Kid David (2008, 2012)
  Cloud (2009)
  Kid Glyde (2009)
  Morris (2009, 2011)
  Thesis (2009–2010, 2014, 2017)
  Luigi (2010, 2018)
  Gravity (2010, 2013–2014)
  El Niño (2011,2015)
  DOMkey (2012)
  Victor (2012, 2014–2015, 2016, 2018, 2022)
  Kareem (2015)
  Benstacks (2016)
  Stripes (2019)
  Philip (2020)
  Flea Rock (2021)

 Latin America

  Arex (2012–2013)
  Pelezinho (2005-2006, 2008)
  Muxibinha (2006)
  Daniel QDM (2007)
  Neguin (2009-2011, 2013, 2016)
  Kapu (2010)
  Klesio (2012)
  Luan (2014)
  Ratin (2015, 2017)
  Leony (2016-2018)
  Luka (2018)
  Bart (2019, 2021)
  Alex (2006)
  Salo (2006, 2011)
  Lil G (2008-2011, 2014)
  Alvin (2022)
  Mini Joe (2022)

References

External links 

 Official site

 
Breakdance
Street dance competitions
Red Bull sports events